Estrella del Valle is a Mexican poet. She was born in Córdoba, Veracruz, in 1971 and studied creative writing at the Writer's General Society of Mexico (Sociedad General de Escritores de México, SOGEM).

In 2000, she won the Ephraim Huerta National Prize of Poetry for Fábula para los cuervos.

Her poems have appeared in the anthology Generación del 2000, Literatura Mexicana hacia el Tercer Milenio.

She lives in Los Angeles, California, United States.

Bibliography

Bajo la luna de Aholiba
Fábula para los cuervos (Premio Nacional de Poesía Efraín Huerta,Guanajuato 2000)
La cortesana de Dannan (Premio Nacional de Poesía Ramón López Velarde 2000)
El desierto;dolores (Premio Latinoamericano de Poesía "Benemérito de América,  Oaxaca 2003)
Vuelo México-Los Ángeles.Puerta23 (Mención Honorífica en el VI Premio Latinoamericano Ciudad de Medellín)

Awards and Distinctions:

2007 Mención Honorífica en el VI Premio Latinoamericano de Poesìa Ciudad de Medellin
2003 Premio Latinoamericano de Poesìa "Benemérito de Àmérica" de la Universidad Autónoma de Oaxaca
2000 Premio Nacional de Literatura Efraín Huerta del Estado de Guanajuato
2000 Premio Nacional de Poesía Ramón López Velarde de la Universidad de Zacatecas
1999 Mención Honorífica en el Premio Nacional de Poesía Joven Elías Nandino
 1998 Premio de Poesía Memoración a García Lorca organizado por el Festival Internacional Cervantino y la Sogem

International Magazines:
 The Bitter Oleander,NY
 Bordersenses,TX
The burnside review
 Hunger Magazine, NY
New York International Poetry
Pemmican (on-line)
 Poesia
The Wandering Hermit review, NY, entre otras.

She collaborated on the introduction and translation of the poet Silvia Tomasa Rivera on the Sulphur River Literary Review journal in Texas.

On April, 2007, The Bitter Oleander magazine dedicated, on its Volume 2, number XIII, a series of poems and an interview conducted by American poet, Paul Roth.

Poems of hers have appeared on magazines and supplements of national and international distribution. Her poems take part on the 2000s generation's anthology (Antología Generación del 2000), Literature towards the third millennium, Tierra Adentro list of titles; The water takes shape in the clearing glass' rigor (En el rigor del vaso que la aclara el agua toma forma), Young poets' tribute to Gorostiza, Claudia Posadas' compilation, Resistencia publishing.

Her work has been compiled in several anthologies including: Best Mexican Tales (Los Mejores Cuentos Mexicanos), Joaquín Mortíz, 2003; Mexican Poetry Yearbook (Anuario de Poesía Mexicana), selection by Tedi López Mill and Luis Felipe Fabre, FCE editions, 2004; Best Mexican Poems (Los Mejores Poemas Mexicanos) 2005 edition, selection by Francisco Hernández, Joaquín Mortiz editions and finally Best Mexican Poems (Los Mejores Poemas Mexicanos) 2006 editions, selection by Elsa Cross, Joaquín Mortiz editions.

Scholarships:

2007 Beca Creadores con Trayectoria del Fondo Estatal para la Cultura y las Artes de Veracruz.
 2003 Beca del Fondo nacional para la Cultura y las Artes en el rubro de literatura-cuento
 2001 Beca Creadores con Trayectoria del Fondo Estatal para la Cultura y las Artes de Veracruz
 1997 Beca del Instituto Veracruzano de la Cultura en el rubro de poesía.

Lectures:
 Beyond Baroque Literary Arts Center Febrero 2007
 Syracuse University (Cruel April Festival, Point Contac Gallery) New York, abril 2006
 University of the Pacific California, Abril del 2006 y Noviembre del 2006.
 Berond Baroque Literary Arts Center (Dialogue Across Borders Reading Series, 2005) Venice, California, 2005
 Casa de los Tres Mundos, Granada, Nicaragua, Febrero del 2005

She is an editor of the Caguama magazine in Los Angeles, California.

Her poetry has been translated into English by the translator Toshiya Kamei and the poet Anthony Seidman.

External links
 http://www.juked.com/2006/02/shutdownbaby.asp

Mexican women poets
Living people
1971 births